Patrick Rafter was the defending champion but did not compete that year.

Greg Rusedski won in the final 6–7(6–8), 6–4, 6–4 against Félix Mantilla.

Seeds
The top eight seeds received a bye to the second round.

  Lleyton Hewitt (third round)
  Marat Safin (withdrew because of an upper respiratory infection)
  Tommy Haas (semifinals)
  Yevgeny Kafelnikov (second round)
  Tim Henman (third round, withdrew because of a right shoulder injury)
  Sébastien Grosjean (quarterfinals)
  Younes El Aynaoui (second round)
  Xavier Malisse (third round)
  Rainer Schüttler (semifinals)
  Max Mirnyi (second round)
  Andrei Pavel (third round)
  Ivan Ljubičić (first round)
  Michel Kratochvil (third round)
  Greg Rusedski (champion)
  Arnaud Clément (quarterfinals)
  Fabrice Santoro (third round)

Draw

Finals

Top half

Section 1

Section 2

Bottom half

Section 3

Section 4

References
 2002 RCA Championships draw

Singles